Daniel Stieglitz (born 4 March 1980 in Cham, (Germany)) is a caricature artist, director and writer. He studied animation, illustration and filmmaking at the Kunsthochschule Kassel in Hessia and graduated with the 45min movie "Spielzeugland Endstation" in 2008, which won Hessian Film Award in 2009.

He has worked as a storyboard artist for commercials and movies like the Oscar nominated The Baader Meinhof Complex and did animations for several german TV-Shows.

In 2018 he won the Golden Nosey Award at the ISCA Convention in San Diego

As a professional live caricature artist, he was invited to many international conventions as a guest speaker.

Among others: 
 2015 at the 2. Festival for Graphic Storytelling in Kassel 
 2018 at the Caricature Convention Eindhoven
 2019 at the Eurocature Convention in Vienna
 2019 at the Asociación Española de Caricaturistas Congress in Valencia

Publications

Movies 
 2002: Toons Total – animated Short, director, animation
 2005: Happy End – Jede Geschichte braucht ein Ende, director, screenwriter, producer
 2006: fly and fall, director, screenwriter, producer
 2009: Spielzeugland Endstation, director, screenwriter, producer

Books 
 Drachen gibt's nicht 2016
 Kritzelblock Kassel 2015
 Elli ist schlecht drauf 2017 
 Was mich ärgert, entscheide ich (Illustrator) 2019
 Mein Jahr 2021 mit SWR1 Hits & Storys (Illustrator) 2020
 Luis und Lena - Die Zahnlücke des Grauens (Illustrator) 2020
 Jolly Old Elf: The Art of Santa H. Claus (Illustrator) 2020
 Luis und Lena - Der Zwerg des Zorns (Illustrator) 2021
 Mein Jahr 2022 mit SWR1 Hits & Storys (Illustrator) 2021
 Luis und Lena - Die Scherze des Schreckens (Illustrator) 2022

Awards

Daniel Stieglitz has won numerous international awards, including

 2021 1. Place for Best Caricature of the Year at the ISCA Con 2021 in Las Vegas 
 2021 Silver Nosey 2. Place for Second Best Caricature Artist of the Year at the ISCA Con 2021 in Las Vegas
 2021 1. Place for Outstanding Group Composition at the ISCA Con 2021 in Las Vegas
 2021 1. Place for Best Live Event Style at the ISCA Con 2021 in Las Vegas
 2020 1. Place for Best Caricature of the Year at the ISCA Con 2020 MAILBOX MAYHEM 
 2020 1. Place for Outstanding Group Composition at the ISCA Con 2020 MAILBOX MAYHEM
 2019 1. Place for Best Caricature of the Year at the ISCA Con 2019 in Memphis 
 2019 1. Place for Outstanding Group Composition at the ISCA Con 2019 in Memphis
 2019 1. Place for Outstanding Body Situation at the ISCA Con 2019 in Memphis
 2019 1. Place euroCat for Best Traditional Caricature at the Eurocature 2019 
 2019 1. Place euroCat for Best Political Caricature at the Eurocature 2019 
 2018 Golden Nosey for Best Caricature Artist of the Year at the ISCA Con 2018 in San Diego 
 2018 1. Place for Best Caricature of the Year at the ISCA Con 2018 in San Diego
 2018 1. Place for Outstanding Group Composition at the ISCA Con 2018 in San Diego
 2018 1. Place for Outstanding Body Situation at the ISCA Con 2018 in San Diego
 2018 3. Place for Black and White Technique at the ISCA Con 2018 in San Diego
 2018 1. Place for Rookie of the Year at the ISCA Con 2018 in San Diego
 2018 1. Place for Best Traditional Caricature at the Eurocature 2018
 2018 1. Place for Best 'Theme' Work'  at the Montmartre Minicon Eindhoven
 2018 1. Place for Best Likeness Caricature at the Montmartre Minicon Eindhoven
 2018 1. Place for Most Inspiring Work at the Montmartre Minicon Eindhoven
 2018 1. Place for Overall Best Work at the Montmartre Minicon Eindhoven
 2009 Hessischer Filmpreis for Spielzeugland Endstation
 2006 Prädikat „wertvoll“ for fly and fall
 2006 2. Price for fly and fall at the Visinale 06
 2006 Audience award fly and fall at the Film Festival Oldenburg
 2006 Best Short for fly and fall at the 7. Toti Film Festival Maribor
 2005 Best first Movie for Happy End – Jede Geschichte braucht ein Ende at the internationalen Independent Film Festival Brüssel

References

External links 
 Official website
  Daniel Stieglitz on IMDb

Living people
1980 births
German caricaturists
German male writers
German directors